Calothamnus planifolius  is a plant in the myrtle family, Myrtaceae and is endemic to the south-west of Western Australia. The flowers have 4 petals and 4 narrow bundles of stamens. (In 2014 Craven, Edwards and Cowley proposed that the species be renamed Melaleuca planifolia.)

The species was first formally described by Johann Lehmmann in 1842 in Delectus Seminum quae in Horto Hamburgensium botanico e collectione.

Calothamnus planifolius occurs in the Avon Wheatbelt and Jarrah Forest biogeographic regions where it grows in gravelly clay over laterite. It is classified as "not threatened" by the Western Australian Government Department of Parks and Wildlife.

References

planifolius
Myrtales of Australia
Plants described in 1842
Endemic flora of Western Australia
Taxa named by Johann Georg Christian Lehmann